Paul Katema (born 19 September 1997) is a Zambian footballer who plays as a midfielder for Azam and the Zambia national football team.

Club career
In July 2021, Katema joined Tanzanian side Azam on a two-year contract.

International career

International goals
Scores and results list Zambia's goal tally first.

References

1997 births
Living people
Sportspeople from Lusaka
Zambian footballers
Zambia international footballers
Association football midfielders
Red Arrows F.C. players
Azam F.C. players
Zambia Super League players
Zambia A' international footballers
2020 African Nations Championship players